Ethan de Groot (born 22 July 1998 in Australia) is a New Zealand rugby union player who plays for the  in Super Rugby. His playing position is prop. He has signed for the Highlanders squad in 2020.

De Groot was not selected for Ian Foster’s first All Black Squad in 2022, with Aidan Ross and Angus Ta’avao selected ahead of him. However with the All Blacks being handed their first home series loss to Ireland, De Groot was reselected for the Rugby Championship squad.

Reference list

External links

 

New Zealand rugby union players
Living people
Rugby union props
1998 births
Southland rugby union players
Highlanders (rugby union) players
New Zealand international rugby union players